N Gatz We Truss is the second studio album by American rap group South Central Cartel. It was released on May 10, 1994 via South G.W.K. Records and Rush Associated Labels. Recording sessions took place at Kitchen Sync Studio in Hollywood, California with producers Prodeje and Havikk the Rhime Son, co-producers DJ Gripp, L.V. and DJ Kaos, and executive producer Cary "Havoc" Calvin. The album features guest performances by 2Pac, 3-2, Big Mike, Ice-T, MC Eiht and Spice 1, and also introduced a new member to the group, Patrick "Young Prodeje" Pitts.

The album reached number 32 on the Billboard 200 and number 4 on the Top R&B Albums chart in the United States. It spawned two promotional singles: "Servin' 'Em Heat" and "Seventeen Switches", and a single "Gang Stories", which peaked at No. 63 on the Hot R&B Singles chart and No. 12 on the Hot Rap Singles chart. Along with the singles, music videos were produced for all the three songs and for "It's a S.C.C. Thang".

Track listing

Sample credits
"Bring It On"
"School Boy Crush" by Average White Band
"Drive Bye Homicide"
"Endangered Species (Tales From the Darkside)" by Ice Cube
"Gang Stories"
"Tutu" by Miles Davis
"Hood Took Me Under" by Compton's Most Wanted
"Had to Be Loc'd"
"Ya Getz Clowned" by South Central Cartel
"Hoo Riding in Da Central"
"Flash Light" by Parliament
"Get Up to Get Down" by Brass Construction
"South Central Madness" by South Central Cartel
"Lil Knucklehead"
"Slippin' into Darkness" by War
"Servin' 'Em Heat"
"More Bounce to the Ounce" by Zapp
"Ya Getz Clowned" by South Central Cartel
"Shot Outz"
"World Is a Madhouse" by Silver Convention
"Stay Out Da Hood"
"Get Out of My Life, Woman" by Lee Dorsey
"Pride and Vanity" by Ohio Players
"U Couldn't Deal Wit Dis"
"Love T.K.O." by Teddy Pendergrass

Personnel

Austin Patterson – main artist, producer
Brian K. West – main artist, producer
Cary Calvin – main artist, executive producer
Patrick Earl Pitts – main artist
Larry Sanders – main artist, co-producer
Perry Rayson – main artist, scratches, co-producer
Gregory Scott – main artist, scratches, co-producer
Michael Barnett – featured artist (track 4)
Christopher Juel Barriere – featured artist (track 4)
Aaron Tyler – featured artist (track 15)
Tracy Lauren Marrow – featured artist (track 15)
Robert Lee Green, Jr. – featured artist (track 15)
Tupac Amaru Shakur – featured artist (track 15)
Richard Ascencio – scratches
Robert "Fonksta" Bacon – bass, guitar
Keith Ciancia – keyboards, moog synthesizer
Charles Green – flute, saxophone
Gregory H. Royal – engineering, mixing
Christian Robert Johnson – engineering, recording
Sean Freehill – engineering, recording
Bernard Grundman – mastering
Glen E. Friedman – design, photography

Charts

Weekly charts

Year-end charts

References

External links

1994 albums
South Central Cartel albums
Def Jam Recordings albums
Albums produced by Prodeje